The Loudoun County Parkway is a secondary state highway in eastern Loudoun County, Virginia. The southern portion is signed as State Route 606 from Braddock Road north to Old Ox Road, with the remainder signed as State Route 607.

Route description

South Riding and Arcola

Loudoun County Parkway begins at Braddock Road in South Riding and continues north across U.S. Route 50. The parkway continues north along the western boundary of Washington Dulles International Airport to the intersection of Old Ox Road. The road now goes north towards Loudoun Valley Estates in Ashburn. The parkway then heads north towards Ryan Road.

Brambleton and Ashburn
At Old Ox Road, SR 606 transitions onto Old Ox Road and the SR 607 designation begins for the Loudoun County Parkway. The parkway continues north to a partially-tolled interchange with the Dulles Greenway. The parkway heads north over the Greenway, and past the Verizon campus. After crossing Waxpool Road, the parkway continues north through corporate centers and Redskins Park. This section was once called Panorama Parkway. Until 2006, the section from Smith Switch Road to State Route 7 was an unpaved dirt road, but was rebuilt in 2006 as a four-lane divided highway as part of the Route 28 Improvement Project.  As of 2012, Smith Switch Road no longer intersects directly with Loudoun County Parkway; instead it runs into the extension eastward of Gloucester Parkway that intersects Loudoun County Parkway. The parkway meets SR 7, the Harry Byrd Highway, at an unnumbered SPUI interchange. Just north of there, the parkway terminates at an intersection with George Washington Boulevard, which serves the George Washington University Virginia Campus.

Major intersections

References

Transportation in Loudoun County, Virginia
Parkways in the United States